Sakshyam is a 1995 successful Malayalam-language Indian film, directed by Mohan. The movie is actress Manju Warrier's debut film. The film was produced by K. R. Balakrishnan and Rajan Manakkalathu.

Plot
Brigadier Rajashekaran Nambiar is an officer in the Indian Army. Neighbor Dr. Sunny is an army doctor. The movie starts with a flashback of Nambiar receiving a call from the hospital, alerting him that his wife Susanna's health is deteriorating. Upon receiving this news, he goes to the convent to find his daughter, Smitha. He takes her on a trip to see her mother. On the journey, he recalls forgotten memories of Susanna.

One of these memories is of how he and Susanna met. Rajashekeran was a flirt, an alcoholic and an excessive smoker. When Susanna rejects his attempt at flirting, he becomes determined to get her. He gets his friend, Dr. Sunny, to sway Susanna into liking him. Raj and Susanna eventually get married.

Rajashekharan is from a royal family which  disapprove of her. As time passes, tensions relax between Raj's family and Susanna. Meanwhile, the relations between the couple are tense. After a year of marriage, the couple do not have a child. This is a source of gossip for Raj's family. Raj drinks and becomes depressed over his childlessness. One day while drunk he tells Susanna he doesn't want to live with her anymore. Susanna leaves.

Raj's mother dies suddenly. A family member tells Raj that his mother asked for Susanna before her death. Hearing this, Raj is moved to reunite with Susanna.

Raj throws a farewell party for Dr. Sunny, who has been promoted to Hyderabad. During this party, Raj announces that his wife is pregnant. The story skips to years later at a resort where Raj, his daughter, and Susanna are on holiday. They run into Dr. Sunny, who is now rich and married and has a daughter. Raj later receives a phone call saying that Dr. Sunny was the only survivor in an accident with his family. Dr. Sunny becomes an alcoholic and loses his medical license after he gives a patient the wrong medicine. Raj invites Sunny to live with him. One day, Susana calls Raj telling him to send Dr. Sunny away because he is an alcoholic and dangerous.

Another day, Raj gets a call from the police who inform him that Dr. Sunny is dead, and Susanna is the killer. Susanna is jailed and refuses to explain. Years pass, and Raj gets a call that Susanna is on her deathbed. When Rajashekeran and his daughter arrive, Susanna gives him her diary to read only when he returns to his house.

The diary reveals that Dr. Sunny and Susanna had had a relationship prior to her marriage. Due to Dr. Sunny's financial difficulties, they ended the relationship and Dr. Sunny later encourages Susanna to marry Raj. When Raj wanted a divorce, Susanna tried to commit suicide, but was stopped by Dr. Sunny. The two had an affair. Just when Dr. Sunny was about to call Raj and tell him of his love for Susanna, Raj reunited with her. Her diary also reveals that when Dr. Sunny's wife and daughter died, Dr. Sunny came back mainly to steal away Susanna's child, whom Susanna never liked. Dr. Sunny threatened to leave the child and take Susanna away with him. Susanna pointed a gun at Dr. Sunny, who tells her to kill him. He closes his hand over hers and forces her hand, killing himself. Susanna could have told the true story, but felt she deserved the punishment for her infidelity.

After finishing the diary, Rajashekeran rushes back to Susanna who dies in front of him. The film ends with Rajashekeran and Smitha crying.

Cast
 Murali as Col.Rajasekharan Nambiar
 Suresh Gopi as Military Doctor Sunny
 Gautami as Susanna
 Manju Warrier as Smitha
 Annie as Daisy Sunny
 Innocent as Chittappan
 Venu Nagavalli as Military Dr. Narendran
 Kunchan as Paulose
 Geetha Vijayan as Mariamma
 Nedumudi Venu as Dominic Fernandes
 T. P. Madhavan
 Kundara Johnny as Major

References

External links
 

1995 films
1990s Malayalam-language films
Films directed by Mohan